Talihina Sky: The Story of Kings of Leon is a 2011 rockumentary which follows the Kings of Leon throughout their journey from obscurity to fame to the future. The film was named after the hidden track on their Youth and Young Manhood album.

Background

Cast
 Kings of Leon
 Caleb Followill as himself
 Jared Followill as himself
 Matthew Followill as himself
 Nathan Followill as himself

Release
The film debuted in Ireland on June 25, 2011 and had its U.S. television premiere on August 21, 2011. In September 2011, the film screened at Helsinki International Film Festival in Finland and Athens International Film Festival in Greece, and in October 2011, it screened at Flanders International Film Festival Ghent in Belgium.

Reception

Awards and nominations
 2011, received a Grammy Award nomination for 'Best Long Form Music Video'.

References

External links
 Talihina Sky: The Story of Kings of Leon at the Internet Movie Database
 

American documentary films
2011 films
Rockumentaries
2011 documentary films
Kings of Leon
2010s English-language films
2010s American films